{{DISPLAYTITLE:C25H34O5}}
The molecular formula C25H34O5 (molar mass: 414.53 g/mol, exact mass: 414.2406 u) may refer to:

 9,11-Dehydrocortexolone 17α-butyrate
 THC hemisuccinate

Molecular formulas